Seasons is the third studio album by American nu metal band Sylar. It was released on October 5, 2018 through Hopeless Records. The first single "All or Nothing" was released on August 7, 2018 along with the pre-order for the album.

Track listing

Personnel
Sylar 
 Jayden Panesso – lead vocals
 Miguel Cardona – rhythm guitar, clean vocals
 Dustin Jennings – lead guitar
 Travis Hufton – bass
 Cody Ash – drums, percussion

Production
 Erik Ron – production, recording, mixing, mastering

Charts

References

2018 albums
Sylar (band) albums
Hopeless Records albums
Albums produced by Erik Ron